Eagle is a given name and surname.

People

Native Americans
Adam Fortunate Eagle (born 1929), Ojibwa activist
Big Eagle (c. 1827–1906), Mdewakanton Sioux leader
Don Eagle (1925–1966), Mohawk Native American professional wrestler
Running Eagle, a female Piegan war chief
Chief War Eagle (c. 1785–1851), a Santee Sioux leader
Chief White Eagle (c. 1825–1914), Native American chief of the Ponca, politician, and civil rights leader
William Weatherford (1780–1824), a Muscogee leader, also known as Red Eagle
Eagle of Delight (died 1822), emissary of the Otoe tribe

Sports
Ian Eagle, sports commentator
Joshua Eagle (born 1973), Australian tennis player
Robert Eagle (footballer), English footballer
Trevor Eagle (1932–2000), New Zealand swimmer and businessman

Politicians
Angela Eagle (born 1961), Labour Member of Parliament for Wallasey
James Philip Eagle (1837–1904), Governor of Arkansas; husband of Mary Kavanaugh Eagle
Maria Eagle (born 1961), British politician and solicitor
Mary Kavanaugh Eagle (1854–1903), American activist, clubwoman and book editor; wife of James Philip Eagle

Artists and musicians
Acee Blue Eagle (1907–1959), Muscogee Creek artist
Douglas Spotted Eagle, Native American flutist
Eagle Pennell, American independent filmmaker
Jay Red Eagle, Cherokee flutist
Kathleen Eagle, American novelist

Other
Albert Eagle, English mathematician

Fictional characters
Eddie Eagle, mascot of a National Rifle Association program teaching young children to avoid guns
Emil Eagle, Disney character

English-language surnames
Surnames from nicknames